"Dschinghis Khan" ("Genghis Khan") is a song by German disco group Dschinghis Khan. It was the  entry in the Eurovision Song Contest 1979 and released as the first single from the group's debut album, Dschinghis Khan (1979). It was a number one hit in West Germany, and a top 10 hit also in Austria, Finland, Norway and Switzerland. Cover versions by a number of other artists were subsequently released as singles and album tracks.

Background and release
"Dschinghis Khan" was performed ninth on the night, following 's Peter, Sue & Marc and Pfuri, Gorps & Kniri with "Trödler und Co" and preceding 's Milk and Honey with "Hallelujah". At the close of voting it had received 86 points, coming fourth in a field of nineteen.

The song was written and composed by the prolific duo of Ralph Siegel and Bernd Meinunger, and owes a considerable debt to disco music, specifically of the Boney M. tradition. As the name suggests, it is in praise of the titular Mongol warrior, with verses extolling his military ("and about his enemies he only laughed / because nobody could resist his strength") and sexual ("he fathered seven children in one night") prowess. Indeed, the entirety of his band are the subjects of this paean, being described as exceptional drinkers with a devil-may-care attitude to life ("and the devil gets us early enough").

The song had a lasting success in Japan. In 2014 it was certified gold for 100,000 digital downloads, after first being released digitally in 2006.

In 2020, the Dschinghis Khan lineup led by Wolfgang Heichel and Stefan Track re-recorded the song and filmed its music video in Mongolia, featuring Heichel interacting with a Mongolian tribe.

Track listings

Charts

Weekly charts

Year-end charts

Frederik version

Finnish singer Frederik covered the song as "Tsingis Khan" in his 1979 album Tsingis Khan, with Finnish lyrics by Juha Vainio. According to the website of Frederik, the composer of the original song, Ralph Siegel, considered the Frederik version to be even better than the original. Siegel offered Frederik to also cover the song "Hadschi Halef Omar", which he did as "Sheikki Ali Hassan" in a 1980 single. "Tsingis Khan" peaked at No. 14 on the Finnish Singles Chart and was certified Gold.

Frederik's version of the song is also used as ring entry theme by Russian boxer Denis "Tsingis Khan" Shafikov.

Track listing

Charts

Berryz Kobo version

The Japanese girl idol group Berryz Kobo also released a cover of the song, albeit with toned-down lyrics, which do not make mention to the more explicit details pertaining to war, rape or the consumption of alcoholic beverages found in the 1979 original.

This single release marks the group's first cover song to be slotted as an a-side in a single. There are two versions to this single, a limited edition with a DVD (PKCP-5112~3) and a regular edition (PKCP-5114 – first pressing containing a photo card and a ticket for a raffle to attend an event promoting the single).

The song was used as the main song to the group's musical, running through January 2008.

The single debuted at number 4 in the Oricon Daily Singles Chart and ranked 5th for the week. It was Berryz Kobo's highest selling single until the release of "Motto Zutto Issho ni Itakatta / ROCK Erotic" in 2013.

In 2009, the single was released in Thailand. It became one of the top songs of the year, ranking 26th in the Channel V Thailand's Asian Top 50 Year-End Chart of 2009.

Track listings

Charts

Awards

Japan Cable Awards

|-
| align="center" rowspan="2"| 2008
| align="center" rowspan="2"| "Dschinghis Khan" by Berryz Kobo
| align="center"| Cable Music Award
| 
|-
| align="center"| Grand Prix*
| 

* awarded to the most requested song of the year on the cable radio

Dschinghis Khan × Berryz Kobo single

 is a single by the collaboration unit . It was released on September 17, 2008, following the success of Berryz Kobo's version. The title track "Dschinghis Khan Tartar Mix" features a mix of both groups' vocal tracks. The single also includes both Berryz Kobo and Dschinghis Khan's versions. The music video for the new song had Berryz Kobo digitally placed into a video of an old Dschinghis Khan performance, so that the two groups seem to appear together at the ZDF-Hitparade television show.

The single peaked at No. 35 on Oricon's weekly singles chart, staying in the list for three weeks.

Track listings

Charts

Other covers
 Swedish dansband Vikingarna released a Swedish-language version of the song, "Djingis Khan", on the 1979 album Kramgoa låtar 7 and as a 1979 single with "Annie's sång" acting as B-side. They also scored a Svensktoppen hit with the song for 10 weeks between 24 June-26 August 1979, including topping the chart.
 Spanish singer Iván published a version with unrelated lyrics under the title "Sin Amor" (1979).
 Hong Kong Cantopop singer George Lam released a Cantonese cover of the song "Cheng Ji Si Han", which is included in his 1979 album Choice.
 In Chile, the musical group Malibú published a version in Spanish, called "Genghis Khan" (1979).
 A Thai language version of this song was released by the Thai band Royal Sprites in 1979.
 "Yidden", a cover with unrelated Yiddish lyrics, first recorded by Mordechai Ben David in 1986, is a popular Jewish line dance.
 Another version of this song was performed by Die Apokalyptischen Reiter on the Dschinghis Khan EP (1998).
 The Korean dance/hip-hop group Koyote have also made a cover of the song, "Aja! Aja!", which appears on their 2007 compilation album Dance Best and 9.5.
 A spoof version of this song is routinely performed by the comedy group Blondon Boys, in the Chilean variety late show Morandé con Compañía. It is called "Somos heterosexuales por opción" ("We are heterosexual by choice").

References

External links
Dschinghis Khan version
 
 

Frederik version
 
 

Berryz Kobo version
 Single V profile at the Up-Front Works official website
 
 
 
 

1979 debut singles
2008 singles
1979 songs
Eurovision songs of 1979
Eurovision songs of Germany
German-language songs
Japanese-language songs
Cantopop songs
Number-one singles in Germany
Berryz Kobo songs
Piccolo Town singles
Songs about Genghis Khan
Songs written by Ralph Siegel
Songs written by Bernd Meinunger
Song recordings produced by Tsunku
Vikingarna (band) songs